The Laureano Cordova Mill is a historic grinding mill located about  south of New Mexico State Road 75 on the Rio Pueblo.  It was listed on the National Register of Historic Places in 1974.

It was built in about 1870 in the style of the area's early Spanish settlers.

References

National Register of Historic Places in New Mexico
Commercial buildings completed in 1870
Taos County, New Mexico
Grinding mills in New Mexico